Cornelia Johanna Marretje "Corrie" Bakker (later Stigter, born 15 June 1945) is a retired track and field athlete from the Netherlands. She was part of the Dutch 4 × 100 m relay team that finished fourth at the 1968 Summer Olympics. Her personal best in the 100 m was 11.7 seconds (1965).

After retiring from competition, in 1972 she married John Stigter, and in 1975 gave birth to a son.

References

1945 births
Living people
Athletes (track and field) at the 1968 Summer Olympics
Dutch female sprinters
Dutch female long jumpers
Olympic athletes of the Netherlands
Sportspeople from Utrecht (city)
20th-century Dutch women
20th-century Dutch people